Šaulys is the masculine form of a Lithuanian family name. Its meaning is "shooter," "rifleman". Its feminine forms are: Šaulienė (married woman or widow) and Šaulytė (unmarried woman). Notable people with the surname include:

Irena Šiaulienė (born 1955), Lithuanian politician
Jurgis Šaulys, Lithuanian economist, diplomat, and politician
Kazimieras Steponas Šaulys, Lithuanian Roman Catholic priest, theologian
 (born 1990), Lithuanian chess player 
 (born 1991), Lithuanian chess player 

Lithuanian-language surnames
	
lt:Šaulys